Leonard Wu is an American actor. He is known for his roles as Orus in the Netflix television drama series Marco Polo (2016), Shiwei Chen in the drama television series Bosch (2018), Kinuba in the action film Alita: Battle Angel (2019) and Ryuzo in the video game Ghost of Tsushima (2020).

Early life
Wu was born in Washington, D.C. to Chinese parents. Wu graduated from the UCLA with a BA degree in English.

Career
From 2004 to 2013, he has appeared in a series of short films which lasted for nine years.

He has appeared in various television shows, including NCIS and Bones and several feature films including While She Was Out opposite Kim Basinger, and 17 Again.

In 2016, he portrayed Orus in the second and final season of the Netflix drama television series Marco Polo. In his interview on Cliche Magazine, he stated that "Orus is a fierce and loyal warrior intent on bringing long-held traditions back to the people of Mongolia." In 2019, he portrayed Kinuba in the science-fiction action film Alita: Battle Angel.

In 2020, he then went on to provide the voice and motion-capture of Ryuzo, a leader of the Straw Hat ronin who is a childhood friend of the main character, Daisuke Tsuji's character, in the PlayStation 4 video game Ghost of Tsushima.

Wu has recently appeared on the gritty feature film based on the New York gang warfare of the 1990s, Revenge of the Green Dragons, from director Andrew Lau.

Filmography

Film

Television

Video games

References

External links
 

1986 births
American male film actors
American male television actors
American male voice actors
American male video game actors
American male actors of Chinese descent
American people of Chinese descent
Male actors of Chinese descent
21st-century American male actors
Male actors from Washington, D.C.
University of California, Los Angeles alumni
Living people